Strongsville City Schools (SCS) is the school district for the city of Strongsville, Ohio and consists of 8 schools with an overall total of 6,200 students. The 383 teachers that work for the school district are members of a union called the Strongsville Education Association (SEA). In 2013, SEA and the Strongsville School Board were having contract negotiations for the teachers upcoming contract, after the previous one had expired in June 2012. When negotiations were not agreed upon by the time the teachers' union had set, they went on strike in March 2013. The teacher strike lasted for eight weeks. During this time frame, SEA and its president, Tracy Linscott, held picket lines outside of all the schools within the SCS district. Contracts were agreed upon on April 27, 2013, which ended the eight week strike. Teachers were back into the schools by April 30, 2013.

Negotiations 
In the December 2012 five-year-forecast of the SCS district, significant fiscal challenges were outlined. This prompted the Strongsville School Board to seek new concessions in the upcoming contract renewal for the teachers. The School Board wanted:

 Requiring teachers to pay a portion, 15 percent, of their own dental care premiums
 Increasing the teachers monthly health premium
 Conversion of the 9.3% pension pick-up to a 9.3% salary increase
 Using teacher evaluations for lay-offs and only relying on seniority as a tie-breaker

The Strongsville Education Association did not agree with the percentages and new increases in their healthcare. SEA claimed terms were unfair over the course of negotiations before the strike.  The teachers argued that their salary scale had not been increased since the 2007-2008 school year and that their health coverage had already increased since then. Over the course of the eight week strike, Tracy Linscott, SEA President, negotiated with the School Board and the Board President, David Frazee. The final contract was agreed upon by SEA on Saturday, April 27 and the School Board voted unanimously on it on Sunday, April 28. In the end the teachers received the pay increases they wanted but took cuts in health insurance coverage. They also faced backlash from the students and the community that did not support the strike.

During the Strike 
On March 4, 2013, students of the SCS district showed up to school and saw their teachers outside with signs and whistles blocking the school driveways. Some of the signs read, "No Contract, No Work!" and, "Lies & tricks will not divide, workers standing side by side". The teachers that were in SEA wore heavy coats and gloves on the picket line. They had tables with hot chocolate and donuts surrounding them, as they had planned to stay outside for the duration of the school day. Several students gathered on the picket line with the teachers to show their support. They had signs that read, "Need a Bandaid for that Scab?", in reference to the nickname the teachers had given the 140 substitutes that had taken their place. When the students that didn't gather on the picket line went into the schools, they were assigned to classrooms by their last names. The classrooms at Strongsville High School were overcrowded because the administration had anticipated lower attendance rates than usual. One picketing teacher at Center Middle School was arrested and charged with disorderly conduct for blocking vehicles from entering the school grounds. On Friday, March 8, just days after the strike began, concerned residents held a rally in the center of town to demonstrate their displeasure with the teachers and SEA. The group that organized the rally called themselves "Taxpayers at the Table" and felt that they should take part in contract negotiations. They were highly displeased with the teachers' tactics and felt they were not demonstrating a good example to their students.

References 

2013 in Ohio
2013 labor disputes and strikes
Labor disputes in Ohio
Labor relations in Ohio
Education labor disputes in the United States